Francis Peter Moore (born 9 March 1938) was a member of the Queensland Legislative Assembly.

Early life
Moore was born at Mareeba, Queensland, the son of Charles Moore and his wife Mary Amelia (née McDowall). He was educated at the St Thomas's Convent, Mareeba, St Theresa's Agricultural College, Abergowrie, and St Augustine's College, Cairns before attending the University of Queensland. He became a school teacher and taught at Mareeba State School in 1957 before coming a science master, teaching at Queensland state secondary schools. In 1957 he was a National Service trainee in the Australian Army.

On 2 January 1960 Moore married Elaine Maureen Martin with the marriage producing a son and a daughter.

Public life
At the 1969 Queensland state election Moore, for the Labor Party, won the seat of Mourilyan. He went on to be the member until the 1974 Queensland state election when he was defeated by the National Party's Vicky Kippin.

References

Members of the Queensland Legislative Assembly
1938 births
Australian Labor Party members of the Parliament of Queensland
Living people